The Old English Newsletter is a peer-reviewed academic journal established in 1967. It covers Anglo-Saxon studies and is published by the University of Massachusetts for the Old English Division of the Modern Language Association of America.

The journal publishes an annual Bibliography and Year's Work, which are widely relied upon. Many issues include obituaries of relevant scholars.

The online version contains an archive of several years of the journal's publications.

History
When first established, the Old English Newsletter was published at Binghamton, New York, by the State University of New York's Center for Medieval and Renaissance Studies. In 1975, publication had transferred to the Ohio State University and in 2011 to the Department of English at the University of Tennessee. The journal is now published by the Department of English at the University of Massachusetts, Amherst, still on behalf of the Old English Division of the Modern Language Association of America.

Past editors
1967: Jess B. Bessinger, New York University, and Fred C. Robinson, Cornell (jointly)
1975: Stanley J. Kahrl
1977: Paul E. Szarmach
2011: Roy Liuzza, University of Tennessee

See also 
Anglo-Saxon England

References

External links 
 
Archives, with free access to Volume 1 (1977) through to volume 42 (2009)

English-language journals
English history journals
Publications established in 1967
University of Massachusetts